State Trunk Highway 76 (often called Highway 76, STH-76 or WIS 76) is a state highway in the U.S. state of Wisconsin. It runs north–south in east central Wisconsin from US Highway 45 near Bear Creek to a junction with US Highway 45 in downtown Oshkosh.

The southern section of the present WIS 76 highway between the current WIS 15 (formerly US Highway 45) at Greenville and Oshkosh was previously part of US Highway 45 but was changed to Wisconsin State Highway 76 in the 1990s as an effect of the rerouting of US Highway 45 to a more westerly trunkline via Winchester, Wisconsin.

The northern section of WIS 76 between Greenville and Bear Creek via Shiocton is remarkably unchanged since the 1920s and passes through rural areas. The trunkline between Greenville and Shiocton via Stephensville is particularly scenic with views over the gently undulating and unspoiled countryside.

History
Initially, WIS 76 traveled along present-day CTH-E and CTH-O from WIS 54 near Casco to WIS 17 (now WIS 42) near Rostok. In 1923, WIS 76 was moved from its Door Peninsula route to mostly the northernmost part of its modern route. This was done in favor of assigning CTH-O to WIS 76's former route and replacing WIS 122. The new route traveled from WIS 18 near Appleton to WIS 22/WIS 26 (WIS 26 is now US 45) west of Bear Creek.

By 1999, the southernmost part of WIS 76 (former WIS 122) was removed in favor of re-adding WIS 15 and preparing for the construction of the proposed US 10 and US 45 expressways. In 2003, WIS 76 was extended southward along former US 45 to downtown Oshkosh.

Major intersections

See also

References

External links
 

076
U.S. Route 45
Transportation in Winnebago County, Wisconsin
Transportation in Outagamie County, Wisconsin
Transportation in Waupaca County, Wisconsin